Amy MacFarlane (born November 4, 1974 in Montreal, Quebec) is a former field hockey forward, who earned a total number of 109 international caps for the Canadian National Team during her career. Collegiately, she played for Princeton University where she earned All-Ivy honors.

International Senior Tournaments
 1995 – Pan American Games, Mar del Plata, Argentina (3rd)
 1995 – Olympic Qualifier, Cape Town, South Africa (7th)
 1997 – World Cup Qualifier, Harare, Zimbabwe (11th)
 1998 – Commonwealth Games, Kuala Lumpur, Malaysia (not ranked)
 1999 – Pan American Games, Winnipeg, Manitoba, Canada (3rd)
 2001 – Pan American Cup, Kingston, Jamaica (3rd)
 2001 – World Cup Qualifier, Amiens/Abbeville, France (10th)

References

External links
 Profile on Field Hockey Canada

1974 births
Living people
Canadian female field hockey players
Canadian field hockey coaches
Sportspeople from Montreal
Princeton Tigers field hockey players
Field hockey people from Quebec
Field hockey players at the 1998 Commonwealth Games
Anglophone Quebec people
Pan American Games medalists in field hockey
Pan American Games bronze medalists for Canada
Field hockey players at the 1995 Pan American Games
Medalists at the 1995 Pan American Games
Commonwealth Games competitors for Canada